Love at Times Square is a 2003 Bollywood film directed by and starring Dev Anand with Shoib Khan, Chaitanya Chaudhary and Heene Kaushik. The film had special appearances from Salman Khan and Rishi Kapoor.

Plot
Sweety (Heene) is the daughter of a billionaire Indian Shaan (Dev Anand). The girl's father organizes a musical concert at Times Square where she comes across two young boys: Raj (Shoeb Khan) and Bobby (Chaitanya Chaudhary). Raj is a computer engineer and works in the Silicon Valley whereas Bobby, who is a middle class person, has come to the US in order to earn a bright future. Sweety (Heene) is pursuing her studies in Mass Communication in the US. Both the boys fall in love with the same girl (Sweety).

Sweety drives from New York City to San Jose with Raj to meet her father and on the way, Raj falls in love with her. Meanwhile, Bobby starts work under her father, also in love with Sweety. Both men propose marriage to her but Sweety declines, unsure about love.

Eventually, she falls in love with Bobby after he saves her from a bad guy Ashish Vidyarthi. On New Year's Eve, one year after their initial meeting, Sweety chooses Bobby and the two get engaged.

Cast
 Dev Anand as Shaan
 Moon Moon Sen as
 Heenee Kaushik as Sweety
 Shoib Khan as Raj
 Harish Patel as Natvar
 Chaitanya Chaudhary as Bobby
 Rishi Kapoor as Satellite Channel CEO (Special Appearance)
 Salman Khan as Song (Special Appearance)
 Ananth Mahadevan as Guru Swamy
 Satish Shah as Gujrat Motel Owner
 Ketki Dave as Gujarat Motel Owner’s wife
 Tom Alter as Mr. Gery
 Dalip Tahil as Uncle of Bobby
 Vikram Gokhale as Father of Raj
 Ashish Vidyarthi as Hashmi 'Bullet'

Music
Lyrics were penned by Javed Akhtar and music was composed by Lucky Ali, Rajesh Roshan and Adnan Sami.Lucky Ali and Adnan Sami also gave his voice for the songs.

 "Aa Ja Aa Ja Aa Bhi Ja" - Adnan Sami
 "Aisa Ho Koi" - Kavita Krishnamurthy
 "Raat Hai Jawan" - Adnan Sami
 "Sapna Ho" - Sonu Nigam, Vijeta Pandit
 "Sote Sote" - Lucky Ali, Sapna Mukherjee
 "Woh Ladka Aisa Hoga" - Udit Narayan, Abhijeet, Jaspinder Narula
 "Yahan Pyar Me Dhadke Dil" - Alka Yagnik (composed by Rajesh Roshan)
 "Ye Raste Yeh Masti" - Kavita Krishnamurthy, Lucky Ali

Reception
The film was critically and commercially unsuccessful. It was much criticized for poor writing and plot as well as poor acting by the newcomers. The direction of scenes in New York and transitions between scenes were also criticized. A critic from The New York Times wrote that "The good cheer of Love at Times Square is relentless, and given the film's 155-minute running time, occasionally oppressive".

References

External links
 
 Love at Times Square at Bollywood Hungama

2003 films
2000s Hindi-language films
Films directed by Dev Anand
Films set in the United States
Films scored by Rajesh Roshan
Films scored by Aadesh Shrivastava
Films based on the September 11 attacks
Films set in New York City